Sabrina Seara Parra (born 27 March 1985 in Caracas, Venezuela) is a Venezuelan telenovela actress.

Biography
From a young age, Sabrina developed an interest in acting and modelling. At the age of 16, she enrolled for acting classes in RCTV's 1BC academy with Professor Ralph Kinnard as her instructor.

After finishing her studies at the Marbe de la Castellana college in Caracas, she obtained her first protagonist role in the television series Guayoyo Express produced by Televen. In 2009, Sabrina moved to Venezuelan channel Venevisión to star as the protagonist in the telenovela Los misterios del amor. In 2010, she interpreted her first antagonist role in the telenovela Harina de Otro Costal.

Her breakthrough role came in 2012 when she starred in the successful telenovela by Venevisión titled Válgame Dios. She then moved to the United States to participate in Telemundo's Pasión Prohibida alongside fellow Venezuelan Mónica Spear.

Sabrina will portray the main villain in Televen's upcoming telenovela Señor de los cielos  Nora, La Emprendedora.

In 2020 she became a US citizen.

Filmography

Films

Television

Accolades

References

External links
 

1985 births
Living people
Actresses from Caracas
Venezuelan telenovela actresses